Famalicão is a Portuguese parish in the municipality of Nazaré.  The population in 2011 was 1,740, in an area of 21.72 km².

References

Parishes of Nazaré, Portugal